Cobalopsis is a genus of skippers in the family Hesperiidae.

Species 
 Cobalopsis autumna Plötz, 1883
 Cobalopsis catocala Herrich-Schäffer, 1869
 Cobalopsis cocalus (Hayward, 1939) 
 Cobalopsis dagon Evans, W.H., [1955]
 Cobalopsis dictys  (Godman, 1900)
 Cobalopsis dorpa de Jong, 1983
 Cobalopsis monotona Mielke, 1989
 Cobalopsis nero Herrich-Schäffer, 1869
 Cobalopsis obscurior Hayward, 1934
 Cobalopsis similis Mielke, 1989
 Cobalopsis tanna de Jong, 1983
 Cobalopsis valerius (Möschler, 1879)
 Cobalopsis zetus (Bell, 1942)

Former species
Cobalopsis brema Bell, 1959 - synonymized with Eutus rastaca (Schaus, 1902)
Cobalopsis dyscritus (Mabille, 1891) - synonymized with Cobalopsis autumna (Mabille, 1891)
Cobalopsis edda (Mabille, 1891) - synonymized with Cobalopsis nero (Mabille, 1891)
Cobalopsis elegans Hayward, 1940 - synonymized with Cobalopsis valerius
Cobalopsis hazarma (Hewitson, 1877) - transferred to Haza hazarma (Hewitson, 1877)
Cobalopsis latonia Schaus, 1913 - transferred to Papias latonia (Schaus, 1913)
Cobalopsis miaba Hayward, 1940 - synonymized with Cobalopsis valerius 
Cobalopsis potaro (Williams & Bell, 1931) - synonymized with Cobalopsis valerius 
Cobalopsis venias Bell, 1942 - transferred to Lerema venias (Bell, 1942)
Cobalopsis vorgia (Schaus, 1902) - transferred to Rectava vorgia (Schaus, 1902)

References

External links 
 Natural History Museum Lepidoptera genus database
 

 
 Cobalopsis at insectoid.info
 

Hesperiinae
Hesperiidae genera
Taxa named by Frederick DuCane Godman